Great! Movies (stylised as GREAT! movies) is a British free-to-air television channel owned by Narrative Entertainment UK Limited that broadcasts across the UK and Ireland showing films and related content. The channel is transmitted on all the major broadcast platforms in the UK - terrestrial, satellite and cable. The channel is only broadcast in standard-definition.

History

Launch and transmission on satellite

To release Sky guide slots for the launch of SMC and its +1 timeshift, Movies4Men 2 and its +1 service were closed (and thus lost by Freesat viewers).

At launch and until 2018, SMC was broadcast on a free-to-view basis, meaning that access to channel was only available to those with a Sky viewing card, and although no subscription payment was required to view the channel, it was unavailable to Freesat devices.

Sony Movie Channel became fully free to air on satellite on 13 August 2018, in preparation for its full launch on the Freesat programme guide on 9 October 2018. To permit SMC's launch on Freesat, Sony reorganised their other movie channels on the guide: Movies4Men +1 was no longer listed on the Freesat guide as a result of the addition of SMC, though remains freely available for manual tune-in. Encryption was also removed from Sony Movie Channel +1 at the same time, though this was not added to the Freesat full guide.

On 24 July 2019, it was announced that the channel will be renamed as Sony Movies from 10 September 2019.

Freeview and cable (Movie Mix)

When launched on 15 July 2009, The Big Deal broadcast live interactive quiz content 7 days a week from 22:00-05:00 on Freeview channel 37 (later channel 32), initially timesharing with RT and Create and Craft. Each night, The Big Deal broadcast various games and puzzles, with cash prizes to be won for viewers who guessed the correct answers. Viewers were asked to call in or log on to The Big Deal website to enter these games. Later in the year The Big Deal reduced its timeslot from 22:00-05:00 to 00:30-05:00.

On 6 November 2009, The Big Deal ceased broadcasting its live quiz content. Teleshopping instead commenced broadcasting between 04:00-06:00, later reduced to 05:00-06:00, in areas yet to undergo digital switchover. A 24-hour version of the channel, meanwhile, was rolled out using the same channel number in post-DSO areas; the fulltime version was made available in all areas on 2 March 2011.

On 12 April 2011, The Big Deal began broadcasting TView, a short-lived pay-per-view film service, with broadcasting hours reduced to 18:00-05:00. The TView service ran until 27 April 2011, when it was replaced by teleshopping, and its hours were reduced further to 18:00-22:00. From 7 July 2011, The Big Deal changed back to operating 05:00-06:00, then, on 6 September 2011 it changed its broadcasting 00:00-04:00. The broadcasting hours were changed again on 20 October 2011 to 03:00-05:00. By this point, in addition to teleshopping presentations the channel also broadcast psychic sessions in which the viewer could ask for their own psychic reading.

On 6 December 2012, The Big Deal was renamed Movie Mix on the programme guide, and reacquired a 24-hour broadcast slot. The channel continued airing chiefly teleshopping - initially via a simulcast of Speed Auction TV - as well as a classic movie each night.

On 17 January 2013, Movie Mix on Freeview began to simulcast the full schedule of films and programmes of satellite channel More Than Movies (previously known as men&movies), though presented under the retained Movie Mix branding. The Movie Mix channel initially remained owned and operated by Cellcast subsidiary Square 1 Management, but using More Than Movies programming under license from Sony Pictures Television.

In March 2014, Cellcast agreed to early termination of its exclusive rights for Movie Mix for a one-off payment of £2.98m from Entertainment Networks, a subsidiary of Sony Pictures Television,. bringing Movie Mix and More Than Movies under common ownership. The channels continued to carry the same programming and split branding as before.

On 22 March 2016, More Than Movies on satellite was closed down and was replaced by True Crime, with Movie Mix retained on Freeview only, broadcasting its own programming schedule, By this time many films on Movie Mix on Freeview were also being broadcast on the Sony Movie Channel on satellite, though the channels retained separate schedules and branding.

On 12 August 2016 Movie Mix began testing on Virgin Media cable systems, with the channel fully launched on 25 August 2016. This meant the Movie Mix schedule was now available on terrestrial and cable platforms, but not on satellite.

In December 2016 it was announced that Sony Movie Channel would be re-launched and made available over cable and Freeview in January 2017, by way of a rebranding of Movie Mix.

On 10 January 2017, the channel replaced Movie Mix on the Freeview and Virgin Media platforms. In preparation for the switch Movie Mix and SMC had been broadcasting an identical schedule in the final days prior to the transition. Although now fully free-to-air on Freeview, the channel remained unavailable to Freesat users until satellite encryption was lifted in August 2018.

Great! Movies
On 25 May 2021, the channel rebranded as Great! Movies as the channel was acquired by Narrative Capital/Narrative Entertainment.

On November 9, 2022, Narrative Entertainment UK Limited announced the launch of a FAST version of Great! Movies, to stream on Samsung TV Plus, the new FAST network has the same branding as the linear channel, but a different schedule. A FAST version of Great! Movies Christmas was also launched.

Logos

References

External links
 

Phone-in quiz shows
Sony Pictures Television
Movie channels in the United Kingdom
Television channels and stations established in 2009
2009 establishments in the United Kingdom